First Choice Airways Limited was a British charter airline of European tour operator TUI Travel PLC, based in Crawley, England until its merger with Thomsonfly to form Thomson Airways (now TUI Airways) in 2008. It flew to more than 60 destinations worldwide from 14 UK and Irish airports. 70% of the airline's services were operated for its parent company, rising to 85% in the summer season, with the remainder on behalf of some 120 other tour operators. It also operated scheduled year-round leisure routes to Cyprus and the resorts of Spain and Portugal.

Its hubs were Birmingham Airport, London Gatwick Airport (primary hub), and Manchester Airport. The long haul services were sold only by internal companies such as First Choice Holidays, Eclipse Direct, Sunsail, Sovereign, Hayes and Jarvis and Unijet. The airline also operated luxury 'Around The World' flights each winter on behalf of TCS Expeditions. 

The company held a United Kingdom Civil Aviation Authority Type A Operating Licence, permitting it to carry passengers, cargo and mail on aircraft with 20 or more seats.

History

Air 2000

The airline started operations on 11 April 1987, launched by the Owners Abroad Group under the name Air 2000, with two Boeing 757-200s and a flight from Manchester to Málaga. The 757s were re-equipped for extended range and flights to the United States began in 1989. Their fleet doubled a year later, with one aircraft being based at Glasgow Airport. In the same year, the airline set up a subsidiary in Canada, to be called Air 2000 Airline Ltd.  This subsidiary lasted only a few days before the Canadian government suspended its licence. The second attempt was more successful and became Canada 3000.

Long haul services to Mombasa in Kenya were introduced during the 1988/89 season. The airline was granted a licence for scheduled operations by the CAA in 1992, which commenced in 1993, initially between London-Gatwick and Paphos, Cyprus. Scheduled services were distinguished by the use of the 'DP' identifier with the flight number, while purely-charter flights used the 'AMM' identifier. Over the next few years scheduled routes to Cyprus from Birmingham, Glasgow, Manchester and Newcastle were introduced. 

Expansion saw new bases in the UK established, with Dublin becoming the airline's first overseas hub in 1996. Leisure International Airways was fully integrated after the acquisition by First Choice of Unijet in June 1998. This included the entire fleet of aircraft, and an order for four Airbus A330-200s, which First Choice immediately cancelled in favor of the rival Boeing 767-300ER. In 2000, additional scheduled services were introduced from eight UK airports to six major Spanish and Portuguese holiday destinations. Air 2000 received a new colour scheme which, by March 2004, the Air 2000 branding was removed and First Choice Airways branding added.

First Choice
The airline carried 6.5 million passengers during 2002. The 2005 total was 6.0 million - fifth highest passenger figures of any UK airline. In 2004 it announced plans to refurbish another six Boeing 767-300 aircraft to expand its long haul operations. The airline was the first in the UK to use the Boeing 777-style interior on their 767 fleet. The company had six aircraft flying long haul in 2007, in a two class layout, 63 Premium, 195 Economy. All seats featured Panasonic seat back entertainment and mood lighting in Star Class Premier.

On 23 April 2007, First Choice confirmed it is to close its bases at London Luton Airport and Cardiff from 1 November 2007 however due to the merger with Thomsonfly who also operate from these bases, the combined airline will still operate from these bases.

Merger with Thomsonfly
In March 2008, the tourism division of the airline's parent group TUI AG, merged with First Choice Holidays PLC, forming the new company TUI Travel. Both Thomsonfly and First Choice Airways would be merged as Thomson Airways.

Thomsonfly Limited changed its name to Thomson Airways Limited in November 2008 and the Thomsonfly operating certificate was changed to Thomson Airways with effect from 1 November 2008. On that date, Thomsonfly and First Choice Airways both rebranded their operations to Thomson Airways, merging with a fleet of 75 aircraft. There is however an order of 12 new Boeing 787 aircraft which will make the fleet 75 once more.

As of 2 October 2017, Thomson Airways began operating under TUI Airways, leaving any vestige of UK travel heritage behind.

Corporate affairs

The head office was located in the First Choice House in Crawley, West Sussex. When First Choice was an independent airline, 450 employees worked there. After the merger with Thomsonfly, TUI moved employees out. The final 70-80 employees were relocated to the former Air 2000 offices at Gatwick Airport.

Destinations

Fleet

Final fleet

The First Choice fleet included the following aircraft (at May 2008):

Aircraft orders
The airline would have been the UK launch customer for the Boeing 787 Dreamliner, having placed a firm order for six aircraft in February 2005, with an option for a further six. In December 2006, the airline announced the purchase of a further two 787 Dreamliners, taking its order to eight aircraft. In March 2007 First Choice Airways announced it was converting all four remaining options to orders, bringing the total to 12 aircraft.

Although planned to enter service in summer 2009, delays to the Boeing 787 programme mean that First Choice Airways would not have been able to introduce the aircraft to the fleet until 2011. Each Boeing 787-8 would have replaced a Boeing 767-300 on long haul routes as they were delivered. The deliveries were expected to take around two years, with six aircraft expected to be based at Manchester Airport and the remainder based at London Gatwick Airport.

The 2008 merger with Thomsonfly meant the newly formed airline, Thomson Airways, inherited the orders and was the UK launch customer. Following the delays in Boeing's development programme, the airline began flights with its first 787 in June 2013

In-flight services
First Choice Airways could include a three course meal pre-ordered for the flight; on First Choice-operated flights it was free of charge if the flight was a long haul flight, if the passengers booked a Premier Holiday. In addition the airline offered drinks, snacks, and sandwiches for purchase as part of a buy on board programme.

See also
List of defunct airlines of the United Kingdom

References

United Kingdom Civil Aviation Authority Statistics of passengers carried by UK. Airlines 2002 and 2005 (Tables 1.6.0)

External links

 [Dead Link]
Official website (Archive)

Airlines established in 1987
Airlines disestablished in 2008
Defunct airlines of the United Kingdom
Companies based in Crawley
TUI Group